Nalimsk is a rural locality (a selo), the only inhabited locality, and the administrative center of Baydinsky Rural Okrug of Srednekolymsky District in the Sakha Republic, Russia, located  from Srednekolymsk, the administrative center of the district. Its population as of the 2010 Census was 502, up from 498 recorded during the 2002 Census.

References

Notes

Sources
Official website of the Sakha Republic. Registry of the Administrative-Territorial Divisions of the Sakha Republic. Srednekolymsky District. 

Rural localities in Srednekolymsky District